The 2017–18 Seattle Redhawks men's basketball team represented Seattle University during the 2017–18 NCAA Division I men's basketball season. The Redhawks, led by first-year head coach Jim Hayford, played their home games at KeyArena and the Connolly Center as members of the Western Athletic Conference. They finished the season 20–14, 8–6 in WAC play to finish in fourth place. It was the Redhawks' first 20-win season since 2008 and first 20-win season in Division I play since the 1960s.

In the postseason, they defeated Texas–Rio Grande Valley to advance to the semifinals of the WAC tournament where they lost to New Mexico State. They received an invitation to the College Basketball Invitational where they lost in the first round to Central Arkansas.

Previous season
The Redhawks finished the 2016–17 season 13–17, 5–9 WAC play to finish in fifth place. Due to Grand Canyon's postseason ineligibility, they received the No. 4 seed in the WAC tournament where they lost in the quarterfinals to Utah Valley.

On March 13, 2017, the school fired head coach Cameron Dollar. His eight-year record at the school was 107–138. On March 29, the school hired Jim Hayford from in-state rival Eastern Washington as their new head coach.

Offseason

Departures

Incoming transfers

Recruiting class of 2017

Roster

Schedule and results

|-
!colspan=9 style=| Non-conference regular season

|-
!colspan=9 style=| WAC regular season

|-
!colspan=9 style=| WAC tournament

|-
!colspan=9 style=| CBI

References

Seattle Redhawks men's basketball seasons
Seattle
Seattle
Seattle Redhawks
Seattle Redhawks
Seattle Redhawks
Seattle Redhawks